The Interstate Highways in Wyoming are the segments of the Dwight D. Eisenhower National System of Interstate and Defense Highways owed and maintained by the Wyoming Department of Transportation. It comprises  on four routes as well as Business Interstate Highways. Construction began in September 1956 on Interstate 25 (I-25) and the network was completed in October 1985. It cost an estimated $570 million to build Wyoming's portion of the Interstate Highway System.



Mainline highways

Business routes

See also

References

External links

Interstate highways